Kicking the Moon Around is a 1938 British musical comedy film directed by Walter Forde and starring Bert Ambrose, Evelyn Dall and Harry Richman. The film marked Maureen O'Hara's screen debut; she appeared very briefly, speaking one line.

Plot summary
In an effort to discover whether his fiancee is a gold digger, a millionaire's son pretends to have lost all of his money.

Cast
 Bert Ambrose and his orchestra - Themselves 
 Evelyn Dall - Pepper Martin 
 Harry Richman - Harry 
 Florence Desmond - Flo Hadley 
 Hal Thompson - Bobbie Hawkes 
 C. Denier Warren - Mark Browd 
 Leslie Carew - Streamline 
 Julian Vedey - Herbert Stoker 
 Max Bacon - Gus 
 Davy Burnaby - Magistrate 
 George Carney - Constable Truscott 
 Edward Rigby - Professor Scattlebury 
 Maureen O'Hara - Secretary

References

External links

1938 films
British musical comedy films
1938 musical comedy films
Films directed by Walter Forde
Films shot at Pinewood Studios
British black-and-white films
1930s English-language films
1930s British films